No. 252 Squadron RAF was a Royal Air Force (RAF) squadron that formed as a bomber unit in World War I and  as part of RAF Coastal Command in World War II.

History

Formation and World War I
No. 252 Squadron was formed at Tynemouth on 1 May 1918 as a day bomber unit when four RNAS flights were amalgamated and was equipped with the Blackburn Kangaroo and DH.6s. One of these flights, No. 510 (Special Duty) Flight was posted to Redcar with its DH.6s for protection of shipping in the Teesport area until 21 January 1919.

The squadron disbanded at RNAS Killingholme on 30 June 1919.

Reformation in World War II

On 21 November 1940 the squadron reformed at RAF Bircham Newton and was equipped with Blenheims and Beaufighters as a Coastal Command unit. It moved to  Northern Ireland  in April 1941 and an attachment went to Gibraltar.

The squadron was disbanded upon renumbering as No. 143 Squadron RAF on 15 June 1941 and re-established at Idku, Egypt on 14 Nov 1941. It then operated from Libya and various locations in  Greece and was finally disbanded on 1 December 1946.

Aircraft operated

References

External links

 History of No.'s 251–255 Squadrons at RAF Web
 252 Squadron history on the official RAF website

252
Military units and formations established in 1918
1918 establishments in the United Kingdom